Lathrecista asiatica, the asiatic blood tail, is a species of dragonfly in the family Libellulidae. It is the only species in its genus. It is widespread, occurring from India to Australia.

Subspecies
Lathrecista asiatica asiatica
Lathrecista asiatica festa (Selys, 1879)
Lathrecista asiatica pectoralis (Kaup in Brauer, 1867)

Description and habitat

It is a medium-sized dragonfly with brown-capped grey eyes and blood red tail. Its thorax is copper brown with a pair of narrow parallel yellow stripes on dorsal side and yellow with stripes on the sides. Segments 1 and 2 of the abdomen have broad lateral stripes and a fine mid-dorsal stripe. Segments 3 to 8 are bright crimson-red with apical sutures narrowly black. Segments 9 and 10 are black. Anal appendages are black. The abdomen of the female is brown.

It breeds in marshes associated with ponds and streams.

See also
 List of odonates of India
 List of odonata of Kerala
 List of Odonata species of Australia

References

Libellulidae
Odonata of Asia
Odonata of Oceania
Odonata of Australia
Insects of Southeast Asia
Insects of India
Insects of Indonesia
Least concern biota of Asia
Least concern biota of Oceania
Taxa named by Johan Christian Fabricius
Insects described in 1798